Coleophora malatiella is a moth of the family Coleophoridae. It is found in Romania and Turkey.

References

malatiella
Moths described in 1952
Moths of Europe
Moths of Asia